David Wilcox may refer to:
David Wilcox (Canadian musician) (born 1949), Canadian rock musician
David Wilcox (American musician) (born 1958), American folk musician
David Wilcox (singer), member of band Triple 8
David Wilcox (D&H), president of the Delaware and Hudson Railway 1903–1907
David Wilcox (screenwriter), television writer and producer
David Wilcox (bishop) (born 1930), British Anglican bishop
Dave Wilcox (born 1942), American football linebacker

See also
Sir David Willcocks (1919–2015), British choral conductor, organist, and composer